Charles William Mayser (June 3, 1876 – July 14, 1967) was an American football, baseball, and wrestling coach. He served three stints as the head football coach at Franklin & Marshall College (1913–1914, 1924–1925, 1944–1945) and was the head football coach at Iowa State University from 1915 to 1919, compiling a career college football record of 46–32–5. Mayser was the head wrestling coach at Iowa State from 1916 to 1923 and at Franklin & Marshall from 1924 to 1946. He was also the head baseball coach at Iowa State for two seasons, from 1919 to 1920, tallying a mark of 18–8–1.

Coaching career

Franklin & Marshall
Mayser served three two-years stints as the head football coach at Franklin & Marshall College: 1913 to 1914, 1924 to 1925, and 1944 to 1945. His record in six seasons was 25–21–3. Mayser also coached wrestling at Franklin & Marshall from 1924 to 1946.

Iowa State
Mayser was the tenth head football coach at Iowa State University and he held that position for five seasons, from 1915 until 1919. His career coaching record at Iowa state was 21–11–2. Iowa State had wanted to hire Charles Brickley as head coach in late 1914.

Honors and death
Mayser was inducted into the Helms Foundation Wrestling Hall of Fame in 1958. He died at a nursing home in Akron, Pennsylvania on July 14, 1967.

Head coaching record

Football

See also
 List of college football head coaches with non-consecutive tenure

References

External links
 

1876 births
1967 deaths
Franklin & Marshall Diplomats athletic directors
Franklin & Marshall Diplomats football coaches
Iowa State Cyclones athletic directors
Iowa State Cyclones baseball coaches
Iowa State Cyclones football coaches
Iowa State Cyclones wrestling coaches
Franklin & Marshall College faculty
Sportspeople from Buffalo, New York